Wessely is the German variant of the Czech surname Veselý. Notable people with the surname include:

Clare Gerada, Lady Wessely (born 1959), British medical doctor

Josephine Wessely (1860–1887), Austrian actress
Karl Wessely (1860–1931), Austrian papyrus scholar
Karl Bernhard Wessely, (1768-1826). Prussian composer.
Kurt von Wessely (died 1917), Austrian tennis player
Naphtali Hirz Wessely (1725–1805), German Hebraist and educator.
Paula Wessely (1907–2000), Austrian actress
Peter Wessely (born 1959), Austrian author
Rudolf Wessely (1925–2016), Austrian actor
Simon Wessely (born 1956), British psychiatrist

See also 
Ferdinand Wesely
Veselí (disambiguation)
Veselý, a surname

German-language surnames